Loring Woart Bailey, (28 September 1839 – 10 January 1925) was a geologist, botanist and university professor. He was born at West Point, New York, the son of a professor at the academy. He received a good education which was reinforced at home through interaction with his father and other academics. He studied at both Harvard University and Brown University and became a professor of chemistry and natural sciences at the University of New Brunswick.

Bailey had a 46-year teaching career at the University as well as much notable research in geology and in 1899 William Francis Ganong, a naturalist friend, named a mountain in New Brunswick after him.

In retirement, he pursued research in biology with a new enthusiasm and published scientific research on diatoms which was widely regarded. He published over 100 scientific works in his lifetime, a number of whish were major works.

His grandson Alfred Bailey was an important poet and academic.

References

Bailey, Loring Woart
Bailey, Loring Woart
Bailey, Loring Woart
Bailey
Bailey, Loring Woart
Bailey, Loring
Bailey
Harvard University alumni
Brown University alumni